Diplocentrus is a genus of toothed scorpions in the family Diplocentridae. There are more than 60 described species in Diplocentrus, found mainly in Central America, Mexico, and the southwest United States.

Species
These 64 species belong to the genus Diplocentrus:

 Diplocentrus actun Armas & Palacios-Vargas, 2002
 Diplocentrus anophthalmus Francke, 1977
 Diplocentrus bellator Teruel, 2003
 Diplocentrus bereai Armas & Martin-Frias, 2004
 Diplocentrus bicolor Contreras-Felix & Santibanez-Lopez, 2011
 Diplocentrus chiapasensis Beutelspacher & Armas, 1998
 Diplocentrus chol Francke, 2007
 Diplocentrus churumuco Francke & Ponce
 Diplocentrus coddingtoni Stockwell, 1988
 Diplocentrus colwelli Sissom, 1986
 Diplocentrus coylei Fritts & Sissom, 1996
 Diplocentrus cozumel Beutelspacher & Armas, 1998 (Cozumel scorpion)
 Diplocentrus cueva Francke, 1978
 Diplocentrus diablo Stockwell & Nilsson, 1987
 Diplocentrus ferrugineus Fritts & Sissom, 1996
 Diplocentrus formosus Armas & Martin-Frias, 2003
 Diplocentrus franckei Santibáñez-López, 2014
 Diplocentrus gertschi Sissom & Walker, 1992
 Diplocentrus gladiator Beutelspacher & Trujillo, 1999
 Diplocentrus hoffmanni Francke, 1977
 Diplocentrus insularis Sagastume-Espinoza et al., 2015
 Diplocentrus jaca Armas & Martin-Frias, 2000
 Diplocentrus keyserlingii Karsch, 1880
 Diplocentrus kraepelini Santibanez-Lopez, Francke & Prendini, 2013
 Diplocentrus lachua Armas, Trujillo & Agreda, 2011
 Diplocentrus landelinoi Trujillo & Armas, 2012
 Diplocentrus lindo Stockwell & Baldwin, 2001 (Lindo scorpion)
 Diplocentrus longimanus Santibanez-Lopez, Francke & Athanasiadis, 2011
 Diplocentrus lourencoi
 Diplocentrus lucidus Stockwell, 1988
 Diplocentrus luisae Guijosa, 1973
 Diplocentrus majahuensis Baldazo Monsivaiz, 2003
 Diplocentrus maya Francke, 1977
 Diplocentrus melici Armas, Martin-Frias & Berea, 2004
 Diplocentrus mellici
 Diplocentrus mexicanus Peters, 1861
 Diplocentrus mitchelli Francke, 1977
 Diplocentrus mitlae Francke, 1977
 Diplocentrus montecristo Armas & Martin-Frias, 2000
 Diplocentrus motagua Armas & Trujillo, 2009
 Diplocentrus ochoteranai
 Diplocentrus ochoterenai Hoffmann, 1931
 Diplocentrus ornatus Stockwell, 1988
 Diplocentrus oxlajujbaktun Trujillo & Armas, 2012
 Diplocentrus peloncillensis Francke, 1975
 Diplocentrus perezi Sissom, 1991
 Diplocentrus rectimanus Pocock, 1898
 Diplocentrus reddelli Francke, 1977
 Diplocentrus roo Armas & Martin-Frias, 2005
 Diplocentrus sagittipalpus Santibanez-Lopez, Francke & Prendini, 2013
 Diplocentrus santiagoi Stockwell, 1988
 Diplocentrus silanesi Armas & Martin-Frias, 2000
 Diplocentrus sinaan Armas & Martin-Frias, 2000
 Diplocentrus sissomi Santibanez-Lopez, Francke & Prendini, 2013
 Diplocentrus spec Stockwell, 1988
 Diplocentrus spitzeri Stahnke, 1970 (Spitzer's scorpion)
 Diplocentrus steeleae Stockwell, 1988
 Diplocentrus taibeli (Caporiacco, 1938)
 Diplocentrus tehuacanus Hoffmann, 1931
 Diplocentrus tehuano Francke, 1977
 Diplocentrus tenango Santibanez-Lopez & Francke, 2008
 Diplocentrus whitei (Gervais, 1844) (Big Bend scorpion)
 Diplocentrus williamsi Sissom & Wheeler, 1995
 Diplocentrus zacatecanus Hoffmann, 1931

References

Further reading

External links

 

Diplocentridae